Viscera is a collaborative album by Byla and Jarboe, released on October 16, 2007 by Translation Loss Records.

Track listing

Personnel
Adapted from the Viscera liner notes.
Musicians
 Kevin Hufnagel – guitar
 Jarboe – lead vocals
 Colin Marston – guitar, recording, mixing, mastering
Production and additional personnel
 Mick Barr – guitar (5)
 Mosquito – recording
 Cedric Victor – art direction, design

Release history

References 

2007 albums
Collaborative albums
Jarboe albums